Morell 2 is a Mi'kmaq reserve located in Kings County, Prince Edward Island. In the 2016 Census, the reserve has 22 residents.

It is administratively part of the Abegweit First Nation.

References 

Indian reserves in Prince Edward Island
Communities in Queens County, Prince Edward Island
Mi'kmaq in Canada